Dhruv Tara – Samay Sadi Se Pare is an Indian television series that premiered on 27 February 2023 on Sony SAB. Produced by Shashi Mittal and Sumeet Mittal under Shashi Sumeet Productions, it stars Ishaan Dhawan and Riya Sharma.

Plot
In 17th century, Senapati Samrat Singh wants to be the king of Vallabhgarh (a fictional kingdom near Agra), however Prince Mahaveer comes in his way. Samrat Singh with help of royal medical practitioner, poisons Mahaveer, which caused brain tumour. The doctors are unable to treat as they don't have the technique to do brain surgery.                            Princess Tarapriya, who is a doctor herself tries her best to cure her brother. Tara get a letter from her mother Queen Saraswati Devi, who suggests her to time travel into the 21st century to find a surgeon who can treat Mahaveer. In order go into the future one must go to the forbidden Navrangvan near the Taj Mahal in it's construction phase then. Tara get imprisoned for meeting her mother, who was facing punishment as she time traveled once by mistake due to poor weather conditions and everyone thought her to be mentally unstable and characterless when she returned. Sangram finds out that Tara is a doctor and lies that she touched him once while treating him in order to get married to her. On her wedding day Tara fleas with the help of her best-friend and Mahaveer's fiancée Anusuya. She goes to Navrangvan and time travels to 2023. 

In 2023, Tara meets a successful Neurosurgeon of Agra, Dr. Dhruv Saxena. Tara tries to convince Dhruv that she had time travel from 17th century. However, Dhruv assume her to be mentally unstable and admit her into Mental hospital. Tara is released from the asylum and goes to a temple after being harassed by some goons. There she got to know about Dr. Dhruv, unaware that he is the one who admitted her into the asylum. Dhruv spots Tara in the temlpe and tries to re-admit her into the asylum. However she escapes and gets hurt in the process. While treating her Dhruv comes to know that she isn't mentally unstable. Tara gets glad to learn that women are allowed to be doctors in the 21st century. Later she saves Dhruv's grandparents and they offer her a hideout at Dhruv's home. However she fails to understand modern day equipments and often falls into trouble.

Dhruv's cousin Jay hates him for his family's preference of Dhruv over him. In back story it is revealed that Dhruv and Ayesha were best-friends since tenth grade and Ayesha slowly developed feelings over him. However Dhruv just considered her as friend and asked her to marry Jay as he loved her. However Ayesha claimed that she won't be able to love Jay, but marries Jay in order to stay near Dhruv, to which Dhruv promised her that he won't love or marry any other girl to respect Ayesha's love and will dedicate his life to brain surgeries only. Tara's hideout in the house is found out by the family. Dhruv's mother at first disrespects and insults her as she thinks that she and Dhruv has an affair.They offer her to work as a maid for them and she obeys it for sake of her brother.

Cast

Main
 Ishaan Dhawan as Dr. Dhruv Saxena: Agra's Neurosurgeon
 Riya Sharma as Rajkumari Tarapriya Singh: Princess of Vallabhgarh; Mahaveer's sister; Udaybhan and Saraswati's daughter and a doctor.

Recurring
 Narayani Shastri as Maharani Saraswati Udaybhan Singh: Queen of Vallabhgarh; Mahaveer and Tarapriya's mother; Udaybhan's wife.
 Yash Tonk as Maharaj Udaybhan Singh: King of Vallabhgarh; Mahaveer and Tarapriya's father; Saraswati's husband.
 Krishna Bharadwaj as Yuvraj Mahaveer Singh: Crown Prince of Vallabhgarh; Tarapriya's brother; Udaybhan and Saraswati's son; Anusuya's love-interest and fiancé
 Vineet Kumar Chaudhary as Senapati Samrat Singh: Commander-in-chief of Vallabhgarh 
 Swati Kapoor as Ayesha Malhotra Saxena: Dhruv's former best-friend, one-sided lover and sister-in-law; Jay's wife 
 Krutika Desai as Anusuya: Mahaveer's love-interest and fiancée; Tarapriya's best-friend; Nagarseth's daughter.
 Gulfam Khan as Lalita Saxena: Dhruv's aunt; Jay's mother
 Vijay Kalwani
 Neelima Singh as Susheela Saxena: Dhruv's mother
 Sushil Parashar
 Drisha Kalyani
 Rohit Arora as Mohit Kumar 
 Milky Shrivastav
 Tanay Aul as Jay Saxena: Lalita's son; Dhruv's cousin; Ayesha's husband
 Abha Parmar
 Aashish Kaul

Production
The series was announced on Sony SAB by Shashi Sumeet Productions. Ishaan Dhawan as Dhruv and Riya Sharma as Tarapriya were signed as the leads. Set in Agra, shooting of the series started in December 2022, with Narayani Shastri and Yash Tonk joining the cast as the parallel leads. The promo featuring the leads was released on 23 December 2022.

In January 2023, Swati Kapoor was cast to portray a negative role and was joined by Vineet Kumar Chaudhary and Krishna Bharadwaj.

See also
 List of programmes broadcast by Sony SAB

References

External links
 
 Dhruv Tara – Samay Sadi Se Pare on SonyLIV

2023 Indian television series debuts
2020s Indian television series
Hindi-language television shows
Sony SAB original programming